Sanford Stadium is the on-campus playing venue for football at the University of Georgia in Athens, Georgia, United States (also known as UGA). The 92,746-seat stadium is the tenth-largest stadium in the NCAA. Architecturally, the stadium is known for its numerous expansions over the years that have been carefully planned to fit with the existing look of the stadium. The view of Georgia's campus and rolling hills from the open west end zone has led many to refer to Sanford Stadium as college football's "most beautiful on-campus stadium", while the surrounding pageantry has made it noteworthy as one of college football's "best, loudest, and most intimidating atmospheres". Games played there are said to be played "between the hedges" due to the field being surrounded by privet hedges, which have been a part of the design of the stadium since it opened in 1929. The current hedges were planted in 1996 after the originals were taken out to accommodate the football tournaments for the 1996 Summer Olympics.
 
The stadium is the 9th largest stadium in the United States and the 17th-largest such stadium in the world. Unlike most stadiums that have artificial playing surfaces, Sanford Stadium from the outset had, and continues to have, a natural grass surface, planted with Tifton 419 Bermuda Grass.

History
The stadium is named for Dr. Steadman Vincent Sanford, an early major force behind UGA athletics. Sanford arrived at the University of Georgia as an English instructor in 1903. He later became the faculty representative to the athletics committee and would eventually become president of the university and chancellor of the entire University System of Georgia. In 1911, he moved the university's football venue from its first location, Herty Field, to a location at the center of campus which was named Sanford Field in his honor.

In those early years of football, Georgia played a series of controversial games against in-state rival Georgia Tech. Sanford Field was too small to accommodate the large crowds, forcing Georgia to travel to Tech's Grant Field in Atlanta every year. Sanford wanted Georgia to have a venue that would equal Tech's, and the "final straw" came in 1927 when UGA's undefeated (9–0) team traveled to Tech and lost 12–0. It was alleged that Tech watered the field all night to slow UGA's running backs. Afterwards, Sanford vowed to "build a stadium bigger than Tech", and play the game at Athens every other year.

To fund his vision, Sanford had an idea that members of the athletic association would sign notes guaranteeing a bank loan to fund the stadium construction. Those guarantors would be granted lifetime seats. The response was overwhelming, and in 1928 a loan of $150,000 supported by fans and alumni allowed construction to begin on a stadium whose total cost was $360,000.

Near the existing Sanford Field was a low area between the historic North Campus and the Science Campus (to the south) with a small creek (Tanyard Creek) running through it, creating a clearly preferable choice for the location of the new stadium. This natural valley containing Tanyard Creek would result in reduced costs, as stands could be built on the rising sides of the hill, while the creek could be enclosed in a concrete culvert, on top of which the field would be constructed. The architect for the stadium was TC Atwood of Chapel Hill, North Carolina, where North Carolina's Kenan Memorial Stadium had just been completed with a similar design. The 30,000-seat stadium was built in large part with convict labor, as were many public works projects of that era.

While the location was, then as now, preferable for construction, the result is an uphill walk in any direction leaving the stadium.

The stadium was completed on time, and UGA convinced perennial powerhouse Yale, which has historically maintained close ties with UGA, to be their first opponent in the new stadium. (This also was Yale's first ever football game played in the South.) On October 12, 1929, a capacity crowd of over 30,000 paid $3 per ticket to watch the Bulldogs, under coach Harry Mehre, beat Yale 15–0 in Sanford Stadium's dedication game. The crowd was at the time the largest to witness a college football game in the South, and governors from all nine southern states also were in attendance. Yale donated its half of the game receipts to UGA to help pay off the construction loans, which would subsequently be completely repaid in just five years. Dr. Sanford also was at this game, and attended many Georgia games at the stadium named in his honor until his death on September 15, 1945.

Sanford Stadium's hedges have encircled the field since the stadium's first game against Yale in 1929. The idea to put hedges around the field came from the Business Manager of the UGA Athletic Department, Charlie Martin. Martin claimed to have received inspiration for the idea during a visit to the Rose Bowl, where he saw the hedge of roses in that stadium. Roses were not a suitable choice for the climate in Athens, so privet hedges were used instead. Six other SEC stadiums have copied UGA and now have hedges, making this feature no longer unique to UGA, but Georgia has the only one that completely surrounds the playing field.

There is a disagreement as to the exact type of hedge planted at Sanford Stadium. The UGA Media Guide claims that the hedge is an "English privet hedge". A county extension agent in Athens, however, claims online that the hedge is composed of Chinese privet, Ligustrum sinense.

In addition to being a cosmetic touch, the hedges have proven to be an effective (though perhaps unintended) measure of crowd control. While not apparent in photos, the hedges are growing around a chain link fence which stops people who try to push through to the field.  Even though a major traffic path to exit the stadium from both stands runs directly alongside the hedges, fans have only stormed the field and torn down the goalposts once in the entire history of Sanford Stadium.  This occurred after the Georgia vs. Tennessee game on Oct. 7, 2000.

In May 2019, university officials announced that the playing surface of Sanford Stadium would be named in honor of former long time Bulldog head coach and athletic director Vince Dooley. Official dedication of Dooley Field took place in a pregame ceremony on the Bulldogs' 2019 home opener on September 7.

On September 21, 2019, Sanford Stadium would set an attendance record of 93,246 in the Bulldogs victory against #7 Notre Dame. Aluminum bleachers were added to raise the capacity of the stadium by 500 due to the agreement between both UGA and the University of Notre Dame to allocate 8,000 visitor tickets for each game in the home and away series.

Stadium expansions
The original stadium consisted of the lower half of the current facility's grandstand seats.  In 1940, field-level lights were added, and Georgia played its first night game against Kentucky to a 7–7 tie.  The stadium's first major expansion took place in 1949, with the addition of 6,000 seats on the south side, bringing total capacity to 36,000.

During the 1960s, many universities in the South were significantly expanding their stadiums, and Georgia was no different. Soon after the arrival of head coach Vince Dooley in 1964, UGA began updating Sanford Stadium, removing the field-level lighting (which obstructed views from the stands) and adding 7,621 bleacher seats in the end zones, which brought total capacity to 43,621. Architects Heery and Heery of Atlanta were then hired to plan a major expansion. This expansion planning was very tricky, since by that time the stadium was encroached by academic buildings. The plans went forward, however, and the grandstand seats were double-decked in 1967 without the need to demolish or alter any of the surrounding buildings. In addition to the new upper decks, this first major addition included a new pressbox and club seating. In total, 19,640 seats were added to the stadium (bringing total capacity to 59,000), at a cost of $3 million. The new addition was christened with a victory over Mississippi State in 1967.

In 1981, the east endzone was enclosed at a cost of $11.5 million, turning the stadium into a "horseshoe" and eliminating the free view enjoyed by the "Track People". This addition added 19,000 seats, bringing total stadium capacity to 82,122. The first game in the newly expanded stadium was on September 5, 1981, against Tennessee, with Georgia delivering a 44–0 drubbing.

Lights were re-installed in the stadium in 1981. This time, the lights were not located at field level, but built above the upper level, thus not obscuring views of the field. The first game under the "new lights" was a 13–7 victory against Clemson on September 6, 1982.

In 1991, a portion of the west endzone was enclosed, creating a "partial bowl" around the lower level of Sanford Stadium. The west stands could not be completely enclosed due to the proximity of Gillis Bridge (usually called "Sanford Bridge"), a major campus transportation artery, to the stadium. This expansion cost $3.7 million and added 4,205 new seats, bringing total capacity to 85,434.

30 luxury suites were added above the south stands in 1994, and were expanded to 50 suites in 2000. These expansions cost a total of $18 million, and raised total capacity to 86,520.

In 2003, another upper deck was added to the north side of the stadium. It added 5,500 new seats at a cost of $25 million, bringing total stadium capacity to 92,058. Most of these "upper-upper deck" seats are reserved for the fans of the visiting team.

In 2005, installation of a new video display above the west end zone was completed. Ribbon boards were also added along the sides of the stadium. These additions, constructed and maintained by Daktronics, established Sanford Stadium as one of the most visually media intensive venues in the SEC.

The stadium reached its capacity of 92,746 in 2004, when 27 SkySuites were added to the north side of the stadium at a cost of $8 million.

The video board installed from 2005 underwent a $1.4 million overhaul before the 2011 season. The screen size expanded from 25×46 feet to the full scoreboard size of the 52×76 feet. The new video board has full high definition (HD) capability.

On February 14, 2017, the UGA Athletic Board approved a $63 million expansion to renovate the west side of the stadium. The approved design relocated the locker room from the east side to the west side and added a new plaza and recruiting pavilion. Construction began following the 2017 season and was officially opened with a ribbon-cutting ceremony on August 31, 2018, a day before Georgia's first home game of the 2018 season. In 2019, the lights in the Sanford Stadium were updated into LED lights, which cost around $950,000. The first game that demonstrated them was the Notre Dame game on September 21, 2019.

Notable Sanford Stadium games

 October 12, 1929: In the first game played at Sanford Stadium, Georgia upset heavily favored Yale 15–0.
 October 25, 1940: In the first game played under the lights, Georgia tied Kentucky 7–7.
 November 14, 1959: A game winning touchdown in the final seconds from Fran Tarkenton to Bill Heron led the Bulldogs to a 14–13 victory over rival Auburn, and the 1959 SEC Championship.
 September 9, 1965: In the first game of Coach Vince Dooley's second season, Georgia beat Bear Bryant's defending national champions, the Alabama Crimson Tide, 18–17 on a fourth quarter 73 yard flea-flicker touchdown and ensuing two-point conversion.
 September 22, 1984: Georgia beat rival, #2 Clemson, on a last-second 60-yard field goal from Kevin Butler.
 October 28, 1995: The University of Florida becomes the first team to score 50+ points against Georgia in Sanford Stadium in a game deemed "Half a Hundred between the Hedges Game". The Gators' 52 points remains the record for most scored against Georgia "between the hedges."
 October 7, 2000: The Bulldogs snapped a 9-game losing streak to the rival Tennessee Volunteers in a 21–10 victory. This marked the first and only time that fans have successfully rushed the field at Sanford Stadium.
 November 10, 2007: In the first blackout game, the Bulldogs surprised the black-clad crowd by wearing black jerseys for the first time in school history. Georgia went on to defeat #20 Auburn, 45–20.
September 7, 2019: The field was officially dedicated as Dooley Field.
September 21, 2019: In front of a record crowd of 93,246, the Bulldogs defeated #7 Notre Dame 23–17.
November 5, 2022: The AP No. 1 Bulldogs defeated the AP No. 2 and CFP No. 1 Tennessee Volunteers in what would be a Game of the Century.

1996 Summer Olympics
The stadium played host to the Olympic medal competition of men's and women's Olympic football (football) at the 1996 Summer Olympics. Because the required dimensions of a football field are wider than those of an American football field, the hedges surrounding the field had to be removed. This proved to be a controversial measure, as it had not been general public knowledge that the hedges would have to be removed to accommodate the Olympic football competition. In preparation for this necessity, cuttings were taken from the original hedges, three years prior to the Olympics, and cultivated at a secret, off-campus site. During the Olympics, Nigeria and the United States won the men's and women's football gold medals, respectively, at the hedge-less stadium. Once the Olympics were over, the newly grown hedges were transplanted from the two nurseries to the stadium. Sanford Stadium told the United States Football Federation it would not be interested in holding a possible World Cup match if the US gets the nod.

Features
 Georgia's deceased Uga mascots are entombed in a mausoleum in the southwest corner of the stadium.
 Sanford Stadium is one of the few college stadiums, and one of only two in the Southeastern Conference, in which the football field is oriented to face east–west as opposed to north–south (the other is Kroger Field). Many of UGA's opponents have found it difficult to see as the west end zone is still open and the sun shines in the players' faces.
 Until the end of the era of rail travel, executives of the Central of Georgia Railway Co. would park the company president's luxury office rail car on the tracks overlooking the end zone for an excellent view of the spectacle. With food served on china by white-coated porters to the Central of Georgia executives and their guests, the rail car "Atlanta" could be considered Sanford Stadium's original luxury skybox.
 In the 1970s, a multitude of fans began watching games from the railroad tracks that overlooked the end zone. These "Track People", as they came to be known, were able to watch the game for free and became a tradition. The 1981 expansion, however, enclosed the end zone stands and eliminated the view of the field, thus ending the tradition.
 Georgia's fans have only rushed the field and torn down the goal posts once in the stadium's history. It happened on October 7, 2000, after the Bulldogs beat rival Tennessee for the first time since 1988. This statistic is usually credited to the fact that the hedges serve not only cosmetic purposes, but also help with crowd control. Aiding this cause is that the hedges surround, and largely conceal, a low chain-link fence running through their branches around the circumference of the field.
 Through the 1994 season, the field only had the basic markings required for play. There weren't any logos at midfield or writing in the end zone, as had become commonplace in many stadiums.
 The goal line markers on each endzone are marked with the famous oval "G" logo.

See also
 Georgia Bulldogs football
 List of NCAA Division I FBS football stadiums

References

External links

 

Sports in Athens, Georgia
Georgia Bulldogs football venues
American football venues in Georgia (U.S. state)
Venues of the 1996 Summer Olympics
Olympic football venues
Buildings and structures in Athens, Georgia
Sports venues completed in 1929
1929 establishments in Georgia (U.S. state)